Albert Johnson (November 2, 1974 – June 20, 2017), better known by his stage name Prodigy, was an American rapper. With Havoc, he was one half of the hip hop duo Mobb Deep.

Early life 
Prodigy was born on November 2, 1974, in Hempstead, New York, on Long Island. He was raised in LeFrak City, in Queens. He had one elder brother, Greg Johnson. He came from a musical family. His grandfather Budd Johnson was a saxophonist who was inducted into the Big Band and Jazz Hall of Fame in 1993. His grand-uncle, Keg Johnson, was a trombonist. Both of them are remembered for their contributions to the bebop era of jazz. His mother, Fatima Frances (Collins) Johnson, was a member of The Crystals. His father, Budd Johnson Jr., was a member of a doo-wop music group called The Chanters. His great-great-great-grandfather, William Jefferson White, founded Georgia's Morehouse College.

While attending the High School of Art and Design in Manhattan, he met his future music partner, Havoc. The duo became Poetical Prophets before choosing the name Mobb Deep. Under the alias Lord-T (The Golden Child), the then-16-year-old Johnson landed an uncredited guest appearance on the Boyz n the Hood soundtrack, for his collaborative efforts on the song "Too Young" by Hi-Five in 1991. In 1993, Mobb Deep released its debut album Juvenile Hell on 4th & B'way/Island/PolyGram Records.

Music career

1995–1999: The Infamous, Hell on Earth and Murda Muzik 
Initially compared to fellow rapper Nas, who took a similar approach lyrically on his Illmatic album from 1994, Mobb Deep released The Infamous in 1995, which was certified Gold by the RIAA within the first two months of its release. 1995 was also the year that Prodigy began to raise his solo profile, by providing a guest appearance on LL Cool J's controversial "I Shot Ya (remix)". The song became a minor part of the East Coast–West Coast hip hop rivalry, due to Tupac Shakur believing the song to be a diss referring to his robbery/shooting in Manhattan, New York at Quad Recording Studios – singling out the song's title (which many assumed was connected to Biggie's "Who Shot Ya?"), certain lyrics, and the timing of its release – the year after the shooting incident.

Although the track was stated by Keith Murray to not have any lyrical shots aimed at Tupac, Mobb Deep responded in the following year to Tupac's "Hit Em Up" with "Drop a Gem on 'Em," a promotional single from their 1996 album Hell On Earth. Ironically, "I Shot Ya" does feature a subliminal aim in Prodigy's verse to Murray, which continued friction that started sometime prior with an interlude from Mobb Deep's 1995 The Infamous album. The rivalry continued until sometime in 2012, when the two ended it by taking a picture together.

A year and a half later, at the end of 1996, Prodigy and Havoc released Hell on Earth, which debuted at number six on SoundScan. Their next release, Murda Muzik, was heavily bootlegged while still in its demo stage, leaking, onto the streets and over the internet, rough versions of the nearly 30 songs the duo had recorded.

2000–2006: H.N.I.C. 
In November 2000, Prodigy released his debut solo album H.N.I.C. His followup solo album would be released in 2008.

During the next six years, between the releases of his first two solo albums, Prodigy continued to work with Mobb Deep, releasing Infamy in 2001, Amerikaz Nightmare in 2004, and Blood Money in 2006.

2007–2011: Collaborations and H.N.I.C. Part 2 
During this time, Prodigy had started work on his second solo album, H.N.I.C. Part 2, which was first previewed on his official mixtape The Return of the Mac, and was later released on the independent label Koch Records. The mixtape single, together with the mixtape video, was called "Mac 10 Handle". Prodigy then released H.N.I.C. Pt. 2 through Voxonic Inc., a company in which he was an equity holder. In late 2009, Mobb Deep was released from their contract with 50 Cent's G-Unit label.

During this time, Prodigy was served with a three-year sentence in Mid-State Correctional Facility (a medium-security prison), following a plea agreement stemming from a gun-possession charge. He was officially released on March 7, 2011.

Prodigy was featured in the 2009 documentary Rhyme and Punishment, which documented hip-hop artists who had been incarcerated.

In 2011, Prodigy released a free EP called The Ellsworth Bumpy Johnson EP, his first project after being released from prison.

On April 21, a song titled "The Type", with Curren$y, was released on Curren$y's free album Covert Coup.

In 2011, Prodigy released his autobiography, My Infamous Life: The Autobiography of Mobb Deep's Prodigy.

2013–2014: The Infamous Mobb Deep 
In 2013, Prodigy released his second collaboration album with the Alchemist, titled Albert Einstein. On April 1, 2014, Mobb Deep released The Infamous Mobb Deep, their eighth studio album. In August 2016, he released an untitled EP of five tracks, in partnership with BitTorrent, an association that Prodigy had been working up for a while.

Books 
In 2011, Prodigy released his autobiography, My Infamous Life: The Autobiography of Mobb Deep's Prodigy. It was co-written with Laura Checkoway and published by Touchstone Books.

In 2013 Prodigy co-wrote the urban crime novel H.N.I.C. with British author Steven Savile. It was published by Akashic / Infamous Books. They also co-wrote a second novel,  Ritual, that was released in 2015 by Akashic.

Prodigy co-wrote a cookbook with Kathy Iandoli titled Commissary Kitchen: My Infamous Prison Cookbook. It features a foreword by chef and food personality Eddie Huang and was published in 2016 by Infamous Books.

Legal issues 
The following is a brief timeline and chronology of some of the legal issues that Prodigy faced during his life:

November 6, 2003, Prodigy was arrested in Cohoes, New York, and charged with third degree criminal possession of a weapon and unlawful possession of cannabis. Police reportedly recovered a .25 caliber handgun and cannabis on his person.
October 26, 2006, Prodigy was arrested in New York City and charged with criminal possession of a weapon. He was pulled over in a $120,000 customized bulletproof SUV after making an illegal u-turn around 2:15 AM. After conducting a search of the vehicle, police recovered a .22 caliber handgun in the center console.
October 8, 2007, Prodigy was sentenced to serve three-and-a-half years in prison for illegal possession of a firearm. Originally facing a mandatory sentence of 15 years in prison, Prodigy struck a deal with the prosecution, and pleaded guilty in exchange for the shorter prison sentence.
March 7, 2011, Prodigy was released from Mid-State Correctional Facility in Marcy, New York after serving three years for criminal possession of a weapon. His sentence was reduced by six months for good behavior and he remained on parole until 2014.

Feuds

West Coast 
From 1995 to 1997, the media-fueled "East Coast-West Coast hip hop rivalry" was occurring. This started when Tha Dogg Pound released "New York, New York," to which Mobb Deep took offense, as, in addition to the lyrics, the song's music video portrayed New York buildings being stomped on by Dogg Pound members. In response, Mobb Deep with Capone-N-Noreaga and Tragedy Khadafi released "LA, LA". 2Pac "dissed" Mobb Deep (along with The Notorious B.I.G.) in "Hit 'Em Up" where, in the outro of the song, he made a remark in clear reference to Prodigy's ailment in having sickle cell anemia. Mobb Deep responded in a track called "Drop A Gem On 'Em" which was released as a single 2 weeks before 2Pac was murdered. 2Pac also dissed Mobb Deep on the song "Against All Odds" and "Bomb First (My Second Reply)" which were released after his death. But Prodigy later sampled 2Pac's voice from a freestyle for the chorus on the song "Return of the Mac" (a.k.a. "New York Shit") on his album with the same name.

Def Squad 
On The Infamous track "The Infamous Prelude", Prodigy made remarks about rappers who rap about "smoking weed" and talk about "space shit". Def Squad took offense from this, but the feud was settled when Prodigy and Keith Murray met at a video shoot. The feud was rekindled when Prodigy again referenced "space shit" in his appearance on LL Cool J's "I Shot Ya" which also featured Murray. Murray saw Prodigy at a club one night and punched him. Prodigy recalled the altercation and threatened Murray in the song "In the Long Run" on Hell on Earth. Murray released a song "Call My Name" on his Enigma album dissing Mobb Deep. The feud seemed to die down until Prodigy dissed Murray again in his 2004 song "Bad Blood." Murray has responded with numerous songs since. The feud has since died down, with the two sharing a photograph together with Busta Rhymes on social media. On Twitter, The reconciliation was confirmed by Prodigy in response to the photo not long after.

Saigon 
During an interview, Prodigy stated that he did not like Saigon and Tru-Life (along with many other rappers).

On the night of September 19, 2007, after an impromptu performance by Saigon during a Mobb Deep show, words were exchanged between Saigon and Prodigy. This escalated into an argument, which resulted in a physical altercation when Saigon punched Prodigy twice before leaving the club. Two video versions of the events have since emerged. One version, in slow motion footage, showed Saigon hiding under a table. Another released version of the video, showed Saigon running away from the club. The feud, however, apparently died down, since (in an interview two months before Prodigy's release from prison) Saigon expressed happiness that Prodigy was coming home.

Crooked I 
While in prison, Prodigy wrote a letter about his disillusionment with hip hop and rappers. He directly referenced Crooked I's name in the letter, commenting,

Crooked I responded in a blog entry, and challenged Prodigy to a one-on-one fight upon the rapper's release. Following Prodigy's death, Crooked I paid tribute in honor of him by posting an image of him on Instagram.

Havoc 
In July 2012, Prodigy's musical partner, Havoc, wrote a series of derogatory comments about Prodigy on Twitter, including accusing Prodigy of engaging in homosexual relationships in prison. At first, Havoc claimed that his Twitter account was hacked. However, he later confirmed that he wrote the tweets and expressed his frustrations with Prodigy in an interview with AllHipHop. He stated that Mobb Deep was on an "indefinite hiatus" until the duo worked out their differences. Havoc later released a diss track aimed at Prodigy, which was titled "Separated (Real from the Fake)". Prodigy did not respond to Havoc's song and, even stated publicly, that Mobb Deep would eventually reconcile. In March 2013, the duo announced that they had reconciled and were going on tour.

Illuminati theory 

Some hip hop music has been inspired by the theory that a powerful international secret society exists. Often it is referred to as the Illuminati, after the Bavarian secret society founded in 1776. Complex magazine has claimed it was Prodigy who started the interest in the theory. Prodigy had often spoken publicly against the alleged international secret society during his life.

Prodigy rhymed about a secret society in his collaboration with LL Cool J in the song "I Shot Ya (Remix)", from the 1995 album Mr. Smith. From prison in 2007, not long before the release of H.N.I.C. Part 2, Prodigy wrote and published an open letter to Jay-Z in which he made some cryptic allegations alluding to the theory. In 2008, Prodigy titled a song "Illuminati", from H.N.I.C. Part 2. In his final solo album released during his life, The Hegelian Dialectic (2017), Prodigy also referred to the theory. It was reported that Prodigy was working on a musical about his Illuminati theory at the time of his death.

Illness and death 
In an interview with Vibe in November 2000, Prodigy spoke about what inspired him to directly address his battle with sickle cell disease in his song "You Can Never Feel My Pain", from his debut studio album H.N.I.C. He attributed his nihilism to the "permanent physical suffering" caused by his lifelong battle with the condition.

On June 20, 2017, it was reported that Prodigy had died at the Spring Valley Medical Center in Las Vegas, Nevada, while hospitalized for complications related to his sickle-cell anemia. He was performing in the Art of Rap Tour in Las Vegas with Havoc, Ghostface Killah, Onyx, KRS-One, and Ice-T when he was hospitalized.

According to a coroner's report, Prodigy was admitted to Spring Valley Medical Center after suffering a significant medical episode arising from his life-long battle with sickle-cell anemia. Days later, on the morning of June 20, he was found unresponsive by hospital staff. It was reported at the time that Prodigy died from accidental choking. The complaint, which was filed on behalf of the family by the Gage Law Firm, alleges that the Spring Valley hospital breached their duty of care for Prodigy by "failing to maintain a working IV access," and by "failing to continuously monitor oxygen levels" as ordered by physicians in the hospital, and that those failures led to Prodigy's death.

Discography 

Studio albums
H.N.I.C. (2000)
H.N.I.C. Pt. 2 (2008)
H.N.I.C. 3 (2012)
The Bumpy Johnson Album (2012)
Hegelian Dialectic (The Book of Revelation) (2017)

Posthumous studio album
The Hegelian Dialectic 2 (The Book of Heroine) (2022)

Collaboration albums
Return of the Mac (with the Alchemist) (2007)
Product of the 80's  (2008)
Albert Einstein (with the Alchemist) (2013)
Young Rollin Stonerz (with Boogz Boogetz) (2014)

Filmography 
 Murda Muzik (1999)
 Full Clip (2004)
 Blackout (2007)
 Rhyme and Punishment (2011)

References

Publications

External links 
 Prodigy at Last.fm
 Prodigy lyrics
 findagrave.com

1974 births
2017 deaths
African-American male rappers
American prisoners and detainees
MNRK Music Group artists
G-Unit Records artists
People from Queens, New York
People from Hempstead (village), New York
People from Freeport, New York
Deaths from choking
Rappers from New York City
East Coast hip hop musicians
Gangsta rappers
Deaths from sickle-cell disease
Accidental deaths in Nevada
20th-century African-American people
21st-century African-American people